Hazal Subaşı ( born 2 May 1995) is a Turkish actress and model who won Miss Turkey Supranational 2015 and represented her country at Miss Supranational 2015.

Life and career 
Hazal Subaşı was born on 2 May 1995 in İzmir, Turkey. After Ottoman Empire collapsed, her family is of Turkish descent who immigrated from Thessaloniki (now in Greece). After getting a degree in Public Relations and Advertising from İzmir University of Economics, Subashi competed in Miss Turkey 2015 and earned the third place. Soon she started taking acting lessons.

Filmography

Awards

References

External links 
 
 
 

1995 births
Turkish female models
Turkish television actresses
Living people
Actresses from İzmir